Ademir Ribeiro Souza (born 20 September 1985) is Brazilian professional footballer who plays as a defender for Altos.

Club career
On 12 September 2012, Ademir completed a transfer to Albanian side Skënderbeu Korçë by penning a one-year contract for €50,000. In June 2013, he agreed a contract extension, signing for another year.

In January 2016, he was sent on loan to Laçi until the end of 2015–16 season as part of James Adeniyi transfer to the opposite direction. He played 16 matches during the second part of the season, scoring once, as Laçi finished 7th in championship.

In August 2017, Ademir joined Laçi but this time on a permanent transfer by signing a contract for 2017–18 season. He undergo surgery on 2 November after suffering an injury on 16 October in matchday 5 against Flamurtari Vlorë which means he would be unable to play for the rest of 2017. Ademir recovered faster than anticipated, returning in training on 24 November. He left the club on 23 December 2017 after struggling to deal with injuries.

International career
In April 2013, Ademir expressed his dream to represent Albania national team through naturalization.

Style of play
Ademir's natural position is right-back but he can also be deployed as midfielder.

Personal life
His younger brother Marconi is also a footballer who plays in Brazil. They played together at Skënderbeu Korçë in 2014.

Career statistics

Honours
Skënderbeu Korçë
Albanian Superliga: 2012–13, 2013–14, 2014–15
Albanian Supercup: 2013, 2014

References

External links
AFA profile

1985 births
Living people
Brazilian footballers
Brazilian expatriate footballers
Association football defenders
Kategoria Superiore players
KF Skënderbeu Korçë players
KF Laçi players
Brazilian expatriate sportspeople in Albania
Expatriate footballers in Albania
Alagoinhas Atlético Clube players